Uchana is a developing town and a municipal committee, near city of Jind in Jind district in the Indian state of Haryana.

Education
Uchana has many government and private schools up to senior secondary level (both English and Hindi medium) and four colleges. Ch. Birender Singh, Cabinet Minister in Government of India founded a college named Rajiv Gandhi Mahavidyalaya affiliated to Kurukshetra University and a Nursing college at the outskirts of town (on NH 352, near village Baroda).

Schools
 Govt. Sr. Sec. School, Near Railway Fatak, Uchana
 Govt. Girls Sr. Sec. School, Uchana Mandi
 SD Public School, Railway Road, Near old Bus stand, Uchana
 SSMSD Sr. Sec. School aka Baba Wala School, Uchana Kalan
 Geeta Vidya Mandir High School, Uchana Mandi
 Shivaniaa Public School, Uchana

Colleges 
 SD Girls College Uchana
 Shri Ganeshanand College
 Rajiv Gandhi Mahavidlaya

Demographics
 India census, Uchana had a population of 14,100. Males constitute 54% of the population and females 46%. Uchana has an average literacy rate of 78%, higher than the national average of 74.04%: male literacy is 82%, and female literacy is 74%. In Uchana, 15% of the population is under 6 years of age.

Politics
Uchana (Vidhan Sabha constituency) is always a hot seat in Haryana constituency elections. Premlata (Wife Of Ch. Birender Singh, Union Minister in Modi Cabinet) was elected as MLA (candidate of BJP.) in 2014 while the current MLA is Dushyant Chautala (deputy chief minister of haryana state) after a massive win in 2019 elections. In the general election Uchana comes under Hisar (Lok Sabha constituency) and Brijendra Singh is MP.

Railways and Roadways 
Uchana (UCA) is a railway station on Delhi-Jind-Narwana-Jakhal section of Delhi-Fazilka line that connects Delhi to Punjab. From Uchana, passengers can get direct trains to Jind, Narwana, Delhi, New Delhi, Mumbai, Katra, Jammu, Chandigarh, Jaipur, Kaithal, Kurukshetra, Rohtak, Panipat, Hisar, Sirsa, Jakhal, Firozpur and many other cities.

It is well connected by the road services as well. Privately owned buses and other vehicles run for short routes like Uchana to Jind, Narwana, Hansi, Hisar, Gogharia, Karsindhu etc. Long route direct buses are also available for Delhi, Sangrur, Ludhiana, Amritsar, Patiala, Jammu etc. It is situated on the busy route of Delhi to Sangrur on National Highway 71.

Nearest airport is IGI Airport, New Delhi - 165 km distance (about 3.5 hours ride).

References 

Cities and towns in Jind district